Bontekoe is a surname. Notable persons with the name include:

Cornelis Bontekoe ( 1644–1685), Dutch physician 
Johan Bontekoe (1943–2006), Dutch swimmer
Willem Bontekoe (1587–1657), Dutch sea captain

See also
, a Dutch merchant ship of the Koninklijke Paketvaart-Maatschappij, launched in 1922
Bontecou